De Hel van '63 (English: The Hell of ‘63) is a 2009 Dutch drama film directed by . The film is based on the 1963 edition of the Elfstedentocht, a long-distance ice skating tour in the Netherlands. This 1963 edition became known as "The hell of '63" when only 69 of the nearly 10,000 participants were able to finish the race, due to the extremely low temperatures of -18 °C, powder snow and a harsh eastern wind.

Cast
 Willeke van Ammelrooy – Moeder Will
 Chantal Janzen – Dieuwke
  – TV-commentator
 Pierre Bokma – Harry Linthorst Homan
  – Militair Edwin
 Cas Jansen – Henk Brenninkmeijer
 Herman Otten - Erik

References

External links 
 

2009 films
2009 drama films
Dutch drama films
2000s Dutch-language films